In electronics, an electronic switch is an electronic component or device that can switch an electrical circuit, interrupting the current or diverting it from one conductor to another. Electronic switches are considered binary devices because they can be on or off. When an electronic switch is on, the circuit is closed and when it is off, the switch is open in the circuit.

Typically, electronic switches use solid state devices such as transistors, though vacuum tubes can be used as well in high voltage applications. Electronic switches also consist of complex configurations that are assisted by physical contact. Physical contact typically comes from pressing or flipping a switch mechanically, but other forms of contact, such as light sensors and magnetic field sensors, are used to operate switches.

Types
Depending on application, switches are manufactured in many types. Switches operated by a person are called hand switches. Hand switches consist of many types such as toggle switches, pushbutton switches, selector switches, and joystick switches. Another form is a motion switch; these are typically called limit switches. Limit switches are used to limit the motion of a machine. Limit switches are usually used for preventive safety measures so that a machine will cut off past a specified point. Two of the most common limit switches are lever actuator switches and proximity switches.

In industrial processes, process switches are used to monitor physical quantities. Switches such as speed, pressure, temperature, liquid level, liquid flow, and nuclear level switches are used to monitor vital information so that a process stays in control and never exceeds safety regulations.

The most widely used electronic switch in digital circuits is the metal–oxide–semiconductor field-effect transistor (MOSFET).

Applications
Electronic switches are used in all kinds of common and industrial applications. Household applications consist of simple hand switches like toggle switches and push-button switches. Turning on lights, opening garage doors, and rolling down a car window all use simple switches. Industrial applications for electronic switches consist of more complex systems like conveyors, furnaces, welders, and water pumps. With complex systems, a variety of switches can be used to complete a task, but due to the advantages or disadvantages of certain switch types, the switch should be chosen based on graded efficiency and reliability metrics.

See also
 Relay

References

Electronic circuits